Juuso Pykälistö (born 21 May 1975) is a Finnish rally driver, born in Padasjoki. He has driven in the World Rally Championship with Citroën and Peugeot. Pykälistö has won the Arctic Rally twice. His best showing was 8th in 2005 at Sardinia. From 2004 through 2006, Pykälistö was a test driver for Citroën, testing the new Citroën C4 WRC on gravel. As of 2020, Pykälistö is a medical helicopter pilot at Tampere–Pirkkala Airport. He lives in Nurmijärvi.

Complete WRC results

References

External links
 Profile, Rally Paradise

1975 births
Living people
People from Padasjoki
Finnish rally drivers
Sportspeople from Päijät-Häme